Rachel Vallarelli is an American lacrosse player. In 2019, she became the first woman in history to be invited to the NLL U.S. Elite Combine. Vallarelli became the head coach for the women's lacrosse team at Bard College in November 2021.

Career 
From 2012 to 2015, she attended the University of Massachusetts. In her final season at the university, she was named Atlantic 10 Defensive Player of the Year, and she finished her career with 8th-best goals against average in NCAA history.

In 2019, she was invited to try-out for the New York Riptide, but failed to make the cut. She was then drafted by the Whitby Steelhawks of the Canadian Arena Lacrosse League.

Personal life 
Vallarelli has a degree in sports management.

References

External links 
RV Lacrosse LLC Website 
 and RV Lacrosse

Rachel Vallarelli and RV Lacrosse on Twitch 
Rachel Vallarelli and RV Lacrosse on YouTube
Rachel Vallarelli and RV Lacrosse on Apple Podcasts 
SUNY Purchase coaching bio
UMass playing bio

Living people
American lacrosse players
Lacrosse goaltenders
UMass Minutewomen lacrosse players
Year of birth missing (living people)
Lacrosse players from New York (state)
People from Hartsdale, New York
Sportspeople from Westchester County, New York
Wagner Seahawks coaches
Villanova Wildcats lacrosse
Villanova Wildcats coaches
Fresno State Bulldogs coaches
State University of New York at Purchase faculty
High school lacrosse coaches in the United States
College women's lacrosse coaches in the United States
College men's lacrosse coaches in the United States